A Shastri degree is also awarded to student after degree in old college system of India in other stream than Sanskrit also. ex pg-geologists is known as Bhu gharva sastri भू -गर्भ शास्त्री.In some other term degree is awarded to pupils after years of higher education in the Sanskrit language (at institutions such as Sampurnanand Sanskrit University or Rashtriya Sanskrit Sansthan in India).The length of training required for a Shastri degree is usually seven years following the completion of secondary school, although students may continue training for an additional two years to obtain an Acharya degree. At the completion of their training, while recipients retain their surname for their descendants, they are given the option to change their current surname to reflect attainment of the degree. This degree also enables pupils to become accredited Hindu Priests and Religious Teachers.

Shastri also exists as a surname through patriarchal inheritance, and so people with the name may not necessarily have undergone its associated training.

See also
Shastra
But the Astrology is still under considering subject in various universities as per the UGC guideline. So many Colleges and Institutes are following this guidelines. But the Approval as Astrology Course is still pending. Still issue a certificate as Acharya or Shastri in Astrology are not valid. So many Astrologers claim they are Acharya, But only few of them Acharya or Shastri Degree in other than Astrology subject.

References

Sanskrit
Academic degrees of India